Nick Adderley (b 1965) is a senior British police officer, currently serving as Chief Constable of Northamptonshire Police.

Career 
Adderley grew up in New Moston, Manchester, and joined the Royal Navy in 1981. He then joined Cheshire Constabulary as a police constable and worked his way up to the rank of superintendent and left the Constabulary in 2010.

He then took a break from the Police Service but continued public sector work in the Home Office for two years, then joined Greater Manchester Police (GMP) at his previous police rank of superintendent.

Within the GMP, he was promoted to Chief Superintendent in August 2011, just over a year after he returned to policing. In September 2013, he became the territorial commander of the North Manchester Division; although keeping the same rank it was a more senior role managing over 1400 officers covering the City of Manchester, Cheetham Hill, Blackley, Newton Heath, Moston and surrounding areas. 

In 2015 he was promoted to Assistant Chief Constable at Staffordshire Police after completing his Strategic Command Course.

As of 6 August 2018, Adderley became Chief Constable of Northamptonshire Police.

He is also the National Police Chiefs' Council (NPCC) National Lead for Disclosure and Safeguarding as well as Motorcycling and Criminal Use of Motorcycles. Adderley is soon to be the NPCC role regarding e-scooters.

In 2019 Adderley was involved in the investigation of the death of Harry Dunn in a motor-cycle crash, where a suspect, the wife of a U.S. intelligence officer, claimed diplomatic immunity and left the United Kingdom. Adderley tweeted adversely on the parents decision to sue the suspect in the U.S. civil courts, prompting the parents to call on Adderley to resign. The parents referred Northamptonshire Police to the Independent Office for Police Conduct. The Northamptonshire Police, Fire and Crime Commissioner Stephen Mold spoke to Adderley about the tweet and said that the force's communications should "remain professional and sensitive".

In April 2020, Adderley was rebuked by Home Secretary Priti Patel after controversial comments regarding his department's response to COVID-19 received wide media attention. He had stated at a press conference that while his police would not, "at this stage, start to marshal supermarkets and [check] the items in baskets and trolleys to see whether it's a legitimate necessary item", that if people did not heed his warnings, "we will start to do that". Patel declared that his comments had been "inappropriate". Adderley subsequently backed away from the threatened policing shift.

References

External links 
 Official Northants Chief Twitter Account

British Chief Constables
Living people
Civil servants in the Home Office
Year of birth missing (living people)
Royal Navy sailors